Canopus (or Opération Canopus) was the codename of the first French two-stage thermonuclear test. It was conducted by the Pacific Carrier Battle Group (nicknamed Alfa Force) on 24 August 1968, at the Pacific Experiments Centre near Fangataufa atoll, French Polynesia.  The test made France the fifth country to test a thermonuclear device after the United States, the Soviet Union, the United Kingdom and China.

History 
In 1966, France was able to use fusion fuel to boost plutonium implosion devices with the Rigel shot. Robert Dautray, (real name : Ignatz Koushelewitz) a nuclear physicist, was selected by the CEA to lead the development effort to construct a two-stage weapon. France did not have the ability to produce the materials needed for a two-stage thermonuclear device at the time, so 151 tons of heavy water was purchased from Norway and an additional 168 tons from the United States. This heavy water went into nuclear reactors in 1967 to produce tritium needed for the device.

France was to test the new device as part of a 5-shot series conducted at the nuclear testing grounds in French Polynesia. The device weighed three tons and used a lithium deuteride secondary stage with a highly enriched uranium jacket primary.

Fangataufa was selected as the location of the shot due to its isolation in respect to the main base on Mururoa. The device was suspended from a large hydrogen filled balloon. Nominal yield was  .ctbto  As a result of the successful detonation, France became the 5th thermonuclear nation.

A flotilla codenamed Alfa Force led by French aircraft carrier Clemenceau deployed to the south Pacific during the time of the test. The naval force present around the two atolls massed more than 120,000 tons displacement and represented more than 40% of the tonnage of the entire French navy.

International reactions 

The announcement by France in the late 1960s to test a hydrogen bomb provoked the People's Republic of China to conduct a full scale hydrogen bomb test of its own on 17 June 1967.

In popular culture 
The 1998 film Godzilla uses this particular test as the basis for the origin of the titular monster, a marine iguana mutated by the fallout from the blast while still in its egg (however, the footage in the movie is actually of the United States' Baker Test in 1946.)

See also 
 Gerboise Bleue (French first atmospheric A-bomb)
 Agate (French first underground A-bomb)
 Force de frappe
 Nuclear weapons and France
 List of states with nuclear weapons
 History of nuclear weapons

External links
France's Nuclear Weapons Program at the Atomic Forum
  Archives sur le Centre d'Expérimentations Nucléaires du Pacifique (C.E.P.) à Moruroa, Hao et Fangataufa

Notes

References 

French nuclear weapons testing
1968 in France
1968 in French Polynesia
August 1968 events in Oceania